"Make It Real" is a song by the American sibling group, The Jets, released as a single from their album, Magic in April 1988.

Background
Moana Wolfgramm of the Jets would recall: "'Make It Real' was given to us at the eleventh hour [i.e. last minute]. We needed a slow ballad [when] we were finishing up the last tracks for the 'Magic' album. Our manager Don Powell, Linda Mallah and Rick Kelly wrote this song and it was simple yet very catchy. I remember Liz [Elizabeth Wolfgramm] recorded it on the road after one of our shows, I think somewhere in Texas." One of the two videos for "Make It Real" showed Elizabeth Wolfgramm singing in front of a basic blue screen background: although Elizabeth Wolfgramm was the only group member to sing on the track, still images of the other Jets were shown during the instrumental break.  The other video features the entire band performing the song, with Elizabeth Wolfgramm standing in front of the other group members playing their individual instruments, interspersed with close-up shots of individual band members throughout the song.

The B-side of the cassette single is a non-album track written and produced by oldest member LeRoy entitled "So True".

"Make It Real" reflects back upon a past relationship one year since the singer met her lover. The singer is reminded of the happy times in their relationship and wants another opportunity to rekindle the passion: I loved you / You didn't feel the same / Though we're apart, you're in my heart / Give me one more chance to make it real.
"Make It Real" was the group's fifth (and, to date, final) top-ten hit on the Billboard Hot 100 chart, where it spent two weeks at number four in late June and early July 1988. On the adult contemporary chart, the song was the group's second number-one hit (following "You Got It All" from the previous year). On the Hot Black Singles, "Make It Real" reached number twenty-four.

Track listing
"Make It Real"
"So True" (Only on cassette single)

Chart performance

Year-end charts

References

External links

Single release info at discogs.com

1987 songs
1988 singles
The Jets (band) songs